The Men's Individual large hill ski jumping event at the FIS Nordic World Ski Championships 2011 was held on 3 March 2011 at 17:00 CET. The qualification for this event was planned for 2 March 2011 at 18:00 CET, but it was postponed due to wind and fog to 3 March 2011 at 15:30 CET. Andreas Küttel of Switzerland was the defending world champion while his fellow country man Simon Ammann was the Olympic champion.

Results

Qualifying

Competition Round

References

FIS Nordic World Ski Championships 2011